The FA Women's National League Northern Premier Division is a league at the third-level in the women's football league pyramid in England, along with the Southern division. These two divisions are part of the FA Women's National League and below the Women's Super League and Women's Championship.

The league is played on a home and away basis, with each team playing each other twice, and points being awarded in the standard three points for a win format. The bottom two clubs are relegated, also on a geographical basis, to the Division One Northern, and Division One Midland. The winner plays the winner of the Southern Premier League winner to determine an overall National League champion who is promoted to the Championship.

Northern Premier Division teams are eligible to play in the Women's National League Cup as well as the Women's FA Cup.

Name
It was known as the 'Women's Premier League Northern Division' prior to the 2018–19 season.

Current teams (2022–23 season)

Previous winners

See also
Women's association football
List of women's football teams
List of women's football (soccer) competitions

References

External links
The FA Women's Page
FA Full-time
https://www.rsssf.org/

2
3
Sports leagues established in 1992
Northern England
Third level women's association football leagues in Europe